The Sturgeon Lake Cree Nation is a First Nations band government or "band", part of the Cree ethnic group, a member of the Western Cree Tribal Council, and a party to Treaty 8.  The band controls three Indian reserves, the large Sturgeon Lake 154 and the smaller 154A and 154B.  It is based on the shores of Sturgeon Lake, around Calais, west of Valleyview, in the M.D. of Greenview in the Peace Country of Northern Alberta.  The registered population of the band is 3,064, of those 1,407 are on the band's own reserves.

Notable people 
 Tanya Kappo, Indigenous rights activist

References 

First Nations governments in Alberta
Cree governments
Municipal District of Greenview No. 16